A tasse à café (coffee cup) is a cup, generally of white porcelain and of around 120 ml (4 fl oz), in which coffee is served. It is also sometimes used to serve small portions of rich drinks, such as hot chocolate

A half-sized cup is called a demi-tasse (English demitasse), literally "half-cup".

References

External links

Drinkware
Coffee preparation